The Florentine Gardens was a nightclub in Hollywood, California, at 5955 Hollywood Boulevard, opened on December 28, 1938, by restaurateur Guido Braccini. The building was designed by architect Gordon B. Kaufmann and featured a European garden motif. Manager and emcee Nils Granlund. Nils Thor Granlund (known as N.T.G.) had been a radio announcer, as well as a promoter and producer of live shows in New York. He became manager and emcee of the club and brought in big bands and well-known performers including The Mills Brothers, the Ink Spots, Sophie Tucker, and fan dancer Sally Rand.

The original Florentine Gardens was a restaurant serving Italian food that also offered dancing and live entertainment – often of the burlesque variety. The venue seated over 1000 patrons for dinner and was popular with American servicemen on leave in Hollywood during World War II. Dance performances at the club helped launch the careers of actors Gwen Verdon and Yvonne DeCarlo. Sixteen-year-old Norma Jeane Baker (Marilyn Monroe) met 22-year-old defense plant worker Jim Dougherty at the Florentine Gardens and the couple held their wedding reception at the venue in June 1942.

The club closed in 1948 and new owners renamed it The Cotton Club. It later became a club featuring scantily clad dancers, was a Salvation Army outpost, a dental school, salsa club, and hip hop club. Avalon Attractions started booking acts at the “New Florentine Gardens” in 1981, featuring such acts as Chuck Berry, X, Dead Kennedys, Circle Jerks, Fear, and The Blasters.

Owner Kenneth MacKenzie fought efforts by the City of Los Angeles to demolish the club in 2005 to build a new fire station.

Notable performers

References

 
 
 
 
 

Music venues in California
Jazz clubs in Los Angeles
Music venues completed in 1938
Music venues in Los Angeles
Nightclubs in Los Angeles County, California
Defunct restaurants in Hollywood, Los Angeles
Buildings and structures in Hollywood, Los Angeles
Landmarks in Los Angeles
1938 establishments in California
Restaurants established in 1938
Commercial buildings in Los Angeles
Restaurants in Greater Los Angeles
Companies based in Los Angeles County, California